The Jefferson Correctional Institution  is a state prison for men located in unincorporated Jefferson County, Florida, with a Monticello postal address, owned and operated by the Florida Department of Corrections.  

Jefferson has a mix of security levels, including minimum, medium, and close, and houses adult male offenders.  Jefferson first opened in 1990 and has a maximum capacity of 1179 prisoners.

References

Prisons in Florida
Buildings and structures in Jefferson County, Florida
1990 establishments in Florida